Spaatz may refer to:
 Spaatz Island, Antarctica
 Carl Spaatz (1891–1974), US Air Force general
 Carl A. Spaatz Field, at Reading Regional Airport, Pennsylvania
 General Carl A. Spaatz Award, a U.S. Civil Air Patrol decoration